Wolf–Rayet (WR) can mean:

 Wolf–Rayet star, a type of evolved, massive star
 Wolf–Rayet galaxy, which contains large numbers of Wolf–Rayet stars
 Wolf–Rayet nebula, which surrounds a Wolf–Rayet star